The Buffalo Creek flood was a disaster that occurred in Logan County, West Virginia on February 26, 1972 when a coal slurry impoundment dam burst, causing significant loss of life and property damage. 

The impoundment dam, managed by Pittston Coal, had been declared "satisfactory" by a federal mine inspector four days earlier. In its legal filings, Pittston referred to the accident as "an Act of God."

Terrain and sequence of events 

There were three dams on the site. Dam #3 failed first. It was constructed of coarse mining refuse dumped into the Middle Fork of Buffalo Creek. 

Dam #3's failure was followed by heavy rains. The water from dam #3 then overwhelmed dams #2 and #1. Out of a population of 5,000 people, 125 were killed, 1,121 were injured, and over 4,000 were left homeless. 507 houses were destroyed, in addition to 44 mobile homes and 30 businesses. The disaster destroyed or damaged homes in Saunders, Pardee, Lorado, Craneco, Lundale, Stowe, Crites, Latrobe, Robinette, Amherstdale, Becco, Fanco, Braeholm, Accoville, Crown and Kistler.

Investigation
Two commissions investigated the disaster. The first, the Governor's Ad Hoc Commission of Inquiry, appointed by Governor Arch A. Moore Jr., was made up entirely of either members sympathetic to the coal industry or government officials whose departments might have been complicit in the genesis of the flood. One of the investigators was Jack Spadaro, a man who devoted his time to regulating dam construction for safety. After then-president of the United Mine Workers Arnold Miller and others were rebuffed by Gov. Moore regarding their request that a coal miner be added to the governor's commission, a separate citizens' commission was assembled to provide an independent review of the disaster.

The Governor's Commission of Inquiry report called for new legislation and further inquiry by the local prosecutor. The citizens' commission report, concluded that the Buffalo Creek-Pittston Coal Company was guilty of murdering at least 124 men, women and children. Additionally, the chair of the citizen's commission and Deputy Director of the West Virginia Department of Natural Resources, Norman Williams, called for the legislature to outlaw coal strip mining throughout the state. Williams testified before the legislature that strip mining could not exist as a profit-making industry unless it is allowed by the state to pass on the costs of environmental damage to the private landowner or the public.

The state of West Virginia also sued the Buffalo Creek-Pittston Coal Company for $100 million (equivalent to $ million today) in disaster and relief damages, but a smaller settlement was reached for just $1 million ($ million today) with Governor Moore, three days before he left office in 1977. The lawyers for the plaintiffs, Arnold & Porter of Washington, D.C., donated a portion of their legal fees for the construction of a new community center. West Virginia has yet to build the center, though the center was promised by Governor Moore in May 1972.

Gerald M. Stern, an attorney with Arnold & Porter, wrote a book entitled The Buffalo Creek Disaster about representing the victims of the flood. The book includes descriptions of his experiences dealing with the political and legal environment of West Virginia, where the influence of large coal mining corporations is intensely significant to the local culture and communities. Sociologist Kai T. Erikson, son of psychologist and sociologist Erik Erikson, was called as an expert witness and published a study on the effects of the disaster entitled Everything in Its Path: Destruction of Community in the Buffalo Creek Flood (1978). Erikson's book later won the 1977 Sorokin Award, granted by the American Sociological Association for an "outstanding contribution to the progress of sociology."

Simpson-Housley and De Man (1989) found that, 17 years later, the residents of Buffalo Creek scored higher on a measure of trait anxiety in comparison to the residents of Kopperston, a nearby coal town that did not experience the flood.

Results
Dennis Prince and some 625 survivors of the flood sued the Pittston Coal Company, seeking $64 million in damages (equivalent to $ million today). They settled in June 1974 for $13.5 million ($ million today), or approximately $13,000 for each individual after legal costs ($ today). A second suit was filed by 348 child survivors, who sought $225 million ($ billion today); they settled for $4.8 million in June 1974 ($ million today).

Kerry Albright became known as the "miracle baby" of the disaster. Running from the leading edge of the water, his mother threw him just above the flood level moments before she drowned. He survived with few ill effects, and was reared by his father. His survival gave hope and inspiration to other survivors.

Environmental impacts  
Prior to the disaster, Buffalo Creek was a popular fishing spot. Due to the effects of the flood, Buffalo Creek would not support aquatic life "long after the Feb. 26, 1972 disaster", according to a 2022 account by The Associated Press. After extensive cleanup and remediation efforts, trout restocking began in 2006. By February 2022, 50 years after the accident, trout were once again plentiful in Buffalo Creek.

See also
 Aberfan disaster
 Coal slurry
 Martin County coal slurry spill
 Sludge (film)
 The Buffalo Creek Flood: An Act of Man, a 1974 documentary film about the disaster

References

Bibliography

 
 Gerald M. Stern, The Buffalo Creek Disaster

External links
 
 
  
 
 
 

Logan Coalfield
Coal mining disasters in West Virginia
Tailings dam failures
Dam failures in the United States
Disasters in West Virginia
Environmental impact of the coal industry
History of West Virginia
Environmental disasters in the United States
Logan County, West Virginia
Waste disposal incidents in the United States
1972 in the environment
1972 in West Virginia
1972 mining disasters
1972 floods in the United States
February 1972 events in the United States